Aleksandr Vasilyevich Solovyov  (Udmurt and ; born June 18, 1950) is a Russian politician who was the head of Udmurtia (2014–2017).

References 
 Соловьев Александр Васильевич

1950 births
Living people
People from Alnashsky District
Heads of the Udmurt Republic
United Russia politicians
21st-century Russian politicians
Russian architects
Udmurt people
Members of the Federation Council of Russia (after 2000)